The MPI MP33C is a model of diesel-electric freight locomotives designed and built by MotivePower in Boise, Idaho, USA. To date all orders have been for Australian operators.

In April 2011, five were ordered by CBH Group, Western Australia. In May 2012, ten were ordered by Chicago Freight Car Leasing Australia followed by a further six in June 2013. The latter six were delivered in February 2015.

Specifications
The MP33Cs are hood unit locomotives with a single cab at one end, and ride on three axle bogies of C-C (Co-Co) wheel arrangement (33 signifying 3,300 hp and C, three driven axles per bogie).

The engine blocks for the prime movers are cast in Germany and sent to the Cummins engine plant in Daventry, England, for the final machining and assembly process. They are then fitted to the locomotive in Boise, Idaho.
CF locomotives are fitted with D87 traction motors. CBH Locomotives are fitted with D77/78.

Summary

See also

List of Australian diesel locomotives
List of Western Australian locomotive classes

References

External links
MotivePower website
MP33 spec Sheet

Co-Co locomotives
Diesel-electric locomotives of Australia
MPI locomotives
Railway locomotives introduced in 2012
Standard gauge locomotives of Australia